Pět smyslů člověka is a 1913 Austro-Hungarian comedy film. It was filmed in Prague and is one of the few Czech films of its era to have survived.

External links
 
 Entry at Česko-Slovenská filmová databáze Google translation
 entry at kfilmu.net Google translation

1913 comedy films
1913 films
Austrian silent films
Hungarian silent films
Hungarian black-and-white films
Austrian black-and-white films
Austro-Hungarian films